Jelena Janković was the defending champion, but chose to participate in Florianópolis instead.

Duan Yingying won her first WTA title, defeating Vania King in the final 1–6, 6–4, 6–2.

Seeds

Draw

Finals

Top half

Bottom half

Qualifying

Seeds

Qualifiers

Lucky losers

Draw

First qualifier

Second qualifier

Third qualifier

Fourth qualifier

Fifth qualifier

Sixth qualifier

References
Main Draw
Qualifying Draw

Jiangxi International Women's Tennis Open - Women's Singles
2016 Women's Singles